Kolu or Kolu Pabuji is a village in Phalodi of Jodhpur in Rajasthan. In this village folk-deity Pabuji's was born.

Kolu's nearest village is Dechu, and tehsil Phalodi is 27.1 far.

References

Villages in Jodhpur district